Infantile free sialic acid storage disease (ISSD) is a lysosomal storage disease. ISSD occurs when sialic acid is unable to be transported out of the lysosomal membrane and instead accumulates in the tissue, causing free sialic acid to be excreted in the urine. Mutations in the SLC17A5 (solute carrier family 17 (anion/sugar transporter), member 50) gene cause all forms of sialic acid storage disease.  The SLC17A5 gene is located on the long (q) arm of chromosome 6 between positions 14 and 15. This gene provides instructions for producing a protein called sialin that is located mainly on the membranes of lysosomes, compartments in the cell that digest and recycle materials.

ISSD is the most severe form of the sialic acid storage diseases. Babies with this condition have severe developmental delay, weak muscle tone (hypotonia), and failure to gain weight and grow at the expected rate (failure to thrive). They may have unusual facial features that are often described as "coarse," seizures, bone malformations, enlarged liver and spleen (hepatosplenomegaly), and an enlarged heart (cardiomegaly).

Approximately ~250 individuals with FSASD have been reported in the literature, of which the majority (> 160 cases) are of Finnish or Swedish ancestry. Individuals with FSASD may go misdiagnosed or undiagnosed, making it difficult to determine the true frequency of the disease in the general population.

Symptoms and signs
Symptoms present by eight months of age and are marked by developmental delay followed by neurological complications such as seizures, involuntary eye movements, and ataxia, involuntary muscle movements and failure to gain weight and grow at the expected rate (failure to thrive).  Babies with this condition also have and enlarged liver and spleen (hepatosplenomegaly) and enlarged heart (cardiomegaly).

Cause

Diagnosis
A diagnosis can be made by measuring cultured tissue samples for increased levels of free sialic acid. Prenatal testing is also available for known carriers of this disorder

Treatment
There is no treatment for ISSD. Treatment is limited to controlling the symptoms of this disorder such as administering anti-convulsant medication to control seizure episodes.

References

External links 
  GeneReviews/NCBI/NIH/UW entry on Free Sialic Acid Storage Disorders

Rare diseases
Autosomal recessive disorders